The 1908 New York Giants season was the 26th season of the franchise. The team finished in second place in the National League with a 98–56 record, one game behind the Chicago Cubs.
 
Paced by Turkey Mike Donlin, the offense scored the most runs in the league. Donlin led the team in nearly all batting categories and was second in batting to Honus Wagner.

Giants' pitching shut out the opposition 25 times, a franchise record for 1901 onwards. Future Hall of Famer Christy Mathewson earned the pitching triple crown with 37 wins, 259 strikeouts, and a 1.43 ERA. However, he lost the last game of the season to Three Finger Brown of the Chicago Cubs, and the Giants finished one game back in the pennant race.

That one-game playoff became necessary after Giants rookie Fred Merkle failed to touch second base at the end of a previous contest, costing them a win. In addition, they were beaten by another rookie, Phillies pitcher Harry Coveleski, three times in five days late in the season. Coveleski was subsequently nicknamed "The Giant Killer".

Regular season

Season summary 
The Giants opened the season on the road with a 3–1 victory over the Philadelphia Phillies. The Giants took five of their first six games of the season. The home opener at the Polo Grounds was the biggest in club history, as the Giants attracted over 25,000 fans.  The Brooklyn Superbas took a 2–1 lead into the bottom of the ninth. Fred Merkle pinch hit for Christy Mathewson and got a ground rule double. Merkle safely advanced to third base on a sacrifice bunt. Fred Tenney hit a grounder and Merkle was caught off third. Captain Donlin hit a two-run home run over the right field wall to win the home opener for the Giants by a score of 3–2.

On July 4, Hooks Wiltse had a perfect game heading into the ninth inning. With two out in the ninth, the perfect game was still intact. George McQuillan was hit by a pitch and Wiltse lost the perfect game. on August 27, the Giants won 18 of their last 23 (including four in a row versus the Pittsburgh Pirates) to take the lead in the National League for the first time since April. During the Giants four-game sweep of the Pirates in late August, the electric scoreboard made its debut in New York. The first electric scoreboard was outside Madison Square Garden, and there was another near the Gotham Theatre on 125th Street.

The Merkle Game 
On Wednesday, September 23, against the Chicago Cubs, 19-year-old Fred Merkle committed a base running error that later became known as "Merkle's Boner", and earned Merkle the nickname of "Bonehead."

In the bottom of the 9th inning, he came up to bat with two outs, and the score tied 1–1.  At the time, Moose McCormick was on first base.  Merkle singled, and McCormick advanced to third. Al Bridwell, the next batter, followed with a single of his own.  McCormick went home, apparently scoring the winning run of the game.  The fans in attendance, under the impression that the game was over, ran onto the field to celebrate.

Meanwhile, Merkle, trying to escape the mob of people, ran to the Giants' clubhouse without touching second base.  Cubs second baseman Johnny Evers noticed this, and after retrieving a ball and touching second base, he appealed to umpire Hank O'Day to call Merkle out.  The validity of the ball was disputed – numerous accounts have Giants pitcher Joe McGinnity intercepting the real ball before Evers could get it.  However, since Merkle had not touched the base, the umpire called him out on a force play, and McCormick's run did not count.

Since the run was nullified, the Giants' victory was erased, and the score of the game remained tied.  Unfortunately, the thousands of fans on the field (as well as the growing darkness in the days before large electric light rigs made night games possible) prevented resumption of the game, and it was declared a tie.  The Giants and the Cubs would end the season deadlocked atop the standings and would have a rematch at the Polo Grounds, on October 8.  The Cubs won this makeup game, 4–2, and thus the National League pennant.

Giants manager John McGraw never blamed Merkle for the second-place finish. However, the rookie was hounded by the New York press and fans for years thereafter.

Season standings

Record vs. opponents

Notable transactions 
 July 8, 1908: Bob Spade was claimed off waivers by the Giants from the Cincinnati Reds.
 July 10, 1908: Bob Spade and $5,000 were traded by the Giants to the Cincinnati Reds for Jake Weimer and Dave Brain.

Roster

Player stats

Batting

Starters by position 
Note: Pos = Position; G = Games played; AB = At bats; H = Hits; Avg. = Batting average; HR = Home runs; RBI = Runs batted in

Other batters 
Note: G = Games played; AB = At bats; H = Hits; Avg. = Batting average; HR = Home runs; RBI = Runs batted in

Pitching

Starting pitchers 
Note: G = Games pitched; IP = Innings pitched; W = Wins; L = Losses; ERA = Earned run average; SO = Strikeouts

Other pitchers 
Note: G = Games pitched; IP = Innings pitched; W = Wins; L = Losses; ERA = Earned run average; SO = Strikeouts

Relief pitchers 
Note: G = Games pitched; W = Wins; L = Losses; SV = Saves; ERA = Earned run average; SO = Strikeouts

Awards and honors

League top five finishers 
Roger Bresnahan
 #3 in NL in on-base percentage (.401)

Mike Donlin
 #2 in NL in batting average (.334)
 #2 in NL in RBI (106)
 #2 in NL in slugging percentage (.452)

Larry Doyle
 #3 in NL in batting average (.308)

Christy Mathewson
 NL leader in wins (37)
 NL leader in strikeouts (259)
 NL leader in shutouts (11)
 NL leader in ERA (1.43)

Cy Seymour
 #3 in NL in RBI (92)

Fred Tenney
 NL leader in runs scored (101)

References

External links
1908 New York Giants season at Baseball Reference

New York Giants (NL)
San Francisco Giants seasons
New York Giants season
New York G
1900s in Manhattan
Washington Heights, Manhattan